Patrice Contamine de Latour (17 March 1867 – 24 May 1926), born in Tarragona as José Maria Vicente Ferrer Francisco de Paola Patricio Manuel Contamine and published as J. P. Contamine de Latour, was a Spanish poet who lived in Paris.

He was a friend of composer Erik Satie, whose famous piano suites Sarabandes (1887) and Gymnopédies (1888) were inspired by his poetry. Satie wrote a short comic opera with text by de Latour written under the pseudonym "Lord Cheminot", and also composed the piano piece The Dreamy Fish to accompany a lost tale by de Latour.

Latour died in Paris.

References

1867 births
1926 deaths
French poets
20th-century French non-fiction writers
19th-century French writers